Qayamat is a 2003 Pakistani Urdu film directed by Sangeeta and stars Saima and Shaan.

Plot
The story begins when Afghanistan was invaded from the north by the former Soviet Union in 1979 and a large number of Afghan refugees began crossing over into Pakistan. One such caravan brings Saima to this land of political unrest. Deeba Begum plays Shaan's mother, and Saima is his fiancée. In the war ravages, Deeba and Saima are lost to Shaan and come to Pakistan. They camp in a small town, which is on the Pak-Afghan border, the tribal chief of which used to frequent their town once, and his son, Moammar Rana falls in love with Saima. Meanwhile, the war is halted and Shaan, the true fiancé, comes to this shantytown looking for his mother and his fiancé. The Afghan war pales in front of the weaponry and ferocity that is witnessed between Mommy Rana and Shaan, after that.

Cast
 Moammar Rana
 Saima
 Shaan
 Nirma
 Rasheed Naz
 Deeba
 Shafqat Cheema
 Khushbu
 Irfan Khoosat

2000s Urdu-language films
Pakistani drama films
Films set in Afghanistan
Films shot in Khyber Pakhtunkhwa
Afghanistan–Pakistan relations in popular culture
Films directed by Sangeeta (Pakistani actress)